Sajida Haneef is a Pashtun politician from the city of Mardan within Mardan District in Khyber Pakhtunkhwa, Pashtunistan who has been a member of the Provincial Assembly of Khyber Pakhtunkhwa since August 2018.

Political career
She was elected to the Provincial Assembly of Khyber Pakhtunkhwa as a candidate of the PTI on a reserved seat for women in 2018 general election.

References

Living people
Pashtun people
People from Mardan District
People from Khyber Pakhtunkhwa
Politicians from Khyber Pakhtunkhwa
Women members of the Provincial Assembly of Khyber Pakhtunkhwa
1954 births